Jan Płonka (24 September 1920 – 8 February 2003) was a Polish alpine skier. He competed in two events at the 1952 Winter Olympics.

References

External links
 

1920 births
2003 deaths
Polish male alpine skiers
Olympic alpine skiers of Poland
Alpine skiers at the 1952 Winter Olympics
Sportspeople from Bielsko-Biała
20th-century Polish people